The GWR 4100 Class was a class of steam locomotives in the Great Western Railway (GWR) of the United Kingdom.

The Badminton class express passenger 4-4-0 steam locomotives were introduced in 1897 as a development from the earlier Duke class. The name Badminton was chosen after the Duke of Beaufort's Badminton estate, through which the GWR was building a new line to South Wales at the time.

Further modifications to the design resulted in the Atbara Class entering service in 1900, the names for these locomotives generally being taken from contemporary military engagements or senior army commanders. Later engines were named after cities of the British Empire.

The final batch of locomotives were named after varieties of garden plant and in consequence were known as the Flower Class.

These three types were later standardised and treated as a single class, so are listed together here. Four other prototype 4-4-0s, originally built in 1894 as the Armstrong Class, were also later rebuilt as Badmintons (see below).

This class were subject to the 1912 renumbering of GWR 4-4-0 locomotives, which saw the Bulldog Class gathered together in the series 3300–3455, and other types renumbered out of that series. This class took numbers 4100–4172 (of which numbers 4101–4120 had previously been used by Flower Class locomotives).

Badminton class

The first member of the class, no. 3292, was completed in December 1897 with a domed parallel boiler, a raised Belpaire firebox and an extended, built-up smokebox similar to that used on the Duke Class. The outside frames were curved over each driving wheel axle. It was named Badminton in April 1898. A batch of eleven locomotives, nos. 3293 to 3303, were completed between April and July 1898, with a further batch of eight, nos. 3304 to 3311, between September 1898 and January 1899. The class were the first locomotives on the GWR to be fitted with copper Belpaire fireboxes. The penultimate example, no. 3310 Waterford, was fitted with a domeless parallel boiler, a steel Belpaire firebox, and an enlarged cab.

The class were fitted with a steam chest and slide valves located beneath the cylinders. The valves were driven by Stephenson valve gear. This inverted arrangement of slide valves and steam chest, originally introduced by William Stroudley of the LB&SCR, allowed the valves to drop away from the cylinder's steam port faces when the regulator was closed, thus reducing wear. Because the steam chest was below the cylinders, and not between them, the latter could have an increased diameter. The centre line of the cylinders was inclined at an angle of 6° to the centre line of the valves, each centre line being aligned with the driving centre. This arrangement allowed the valve rods to be driven directly from the expansion link. First used on the Armstrong and 3031 Classes, this arrangement of cylinders, valves and valve gear was subsequently used on all GWR outside framed 4-4-0s, with the slide valves being eventually replaced by piston valves.

The crankpins for the coupling rods were placed in line with the corresponding inside crankpins for the connecting rods. This arrangement was also developed by Stroudley, who claimed that the motion of the inside cranks was smoothly transferred to the coupling rods, as happens in an outside-cylindered engine, where the connecting rod acts directly on a crankpin shared with the coupling rod. According to Stroudley, the axleboxes, bearing surfaces, hornblocks and coupling rods of locomotives with outside cylinders had a service life twice as long as those on inside-cylindered examples. However, by aligning the two cranks together, heavy balancing weights were required on the driving wheels, at 180° to the outside crank, to counteract the combined mass of the cranks and rods. The Badmintons had massive crescent-shaped balancing weights, which made the unmounted pairs of wheels difficult to handle in the workshop.

One locomotive of the Badminton Class was rebuilt with an experimental boiler. With the impending opening of the direct Reading-Taunton route which was of more undulating nature than the route via Bristol, there was a need to ensure that the most appropriate locomotives were provided. Churchward's Chief Assistant, F.G. Wright, designed a large boiler with a very deep firebox, which was fitted to no. 3297 Earl Cawdor in July 1903. The boiler was designed to hold a large volume of hot water, forming a reservoir to assist the locomotive running along an undulating line. This increase in volume was intended to provide a reservoir of steam. The firebox was set deep between the coupled axles, with a horizontal grate. The intention with this was to allow a thick fire to be built up, increasing the area of the firebox in contact with the fire, and decreasing the temperature gradient along the firebox plates, thus reducing the risk of broken firebox stays. No. 3297 was also fitted with a large cab with two side windows, reminiscent of North Eastern practice. The locomotive was regularly rostered on the most demanding trains, but it soon became apparent that it was not up to the work demanded and it was relegated to secondary duties. In October 1906 the boiler was removed and replaced by a Standard No.4 boiler, the North Eastern style side-window cab having been replaced by a Churchward type in November 1904.

Atbara class

No. 3373 Atbara was built in April 1900, the first of a class of forty locomotives. Instead of the curved outside frames of the Badmintons, this class had straight-topped frames, which became the standard pattern for all subsequent outside-framed 4-4-0s. These straight frames were less prone to fracturing, because of the greater depth of plate between the coupled wheels. The Atbaras retained the Stroudley crank layout, cylinders, valves and valve gear of the Badmintons, but differed in the boiler, which was a parallel domeless Standard No. 2 type. No. 3405 Mauritius was reboilered in September 1902 with a tapered boiler, a prototype for the Standard No. 4 type. It was the first GWR 4-4-0 to be fitted with a tapered (or coned) boiler. Following this, another nine Atbaras, nos. 3400 to 3404 and 3406 to 3409, were rebuilt with No. 4 boilers between February 1907 and February 1909. The ten were added to the City Class. Adjudged unrepairable, it was withdrawn in September 1911, so was not included in the 1912 renumbering. The remaining Atbaras were withdrawn between April 1927 and May 1931.

Flower class

The Flower Class were fitted with deeper outside frames than the Atbaras, and a new design of bogie developed from the type fitted to the French de Glehn Atlantics. Twenty of the class were built between April 1910 and January 1913. Three were withdrawn in July 1927, with the last withdrawal, no. 4150 Begonia, going in April 1931.

Prototype 4-4-0 locomotives

The Armstrong Class were a group of four locomotives designed by William Dean and built in 1894 with  driving wheels. In April 1915 no. 16 Brunel was rebuilt with  wheels and piston valves, having already been fitted with a Standard No.2 boiler. It was renumbered 4169 as a member of the Flower Class. No. 14 Charles Saunders was converted in May 1917, and the remaining two were dealt with in February 1923.

References

Bibliography

GWR Engines Names, Numbers Types & Classes. Originally published by the Great Western Railway and Great Western Railway Magazine 1911 and 1928. Reprinted: David & Charles, Newton Abbot, Devon. 1971.

External links
Atbara Class

4100
4-4-0 locomotives
Railway locomotives introduced in 1894
Railway locomotives introduced in 1897
Railway locomotives introduced in 1900
Railway locomotives introduced in 1908
Standard gauge steam locomotives of Great Britain
Scrapped locomotives
Passenger locomotives